The men's 1500 metre freestyle event at the 1960 Olympic Games took place between September 2 and 3. This swimming event used freestyle swimming, which means that the method of the stroke is not regulated (unlike backstroke, breaststroke, and butterfly events). Nearly all swimmers use the front crawl or a variant of that stroke. Because an Olympic size swimming pool is 50 metres long, this race consisted of 30 lengths of the pool.

Medalists

Results

Heats

Five heats were held; the eight fastest swimmers advanced to the Finals.  Those that advanced are highlighted.  The heats were held September 2.

Heat One

Heat Two

Heat Three

Heat Four

Heat Five

Final

The Men's 1500 m Freestyle Final was held September 3.

Key: OR = Olympic record

References

External links

Men's freestyle 1500 metre
Men's events at the 1960 Summer Olympics